Karl Helmut Bach (21 October 1920 – 1 October 1993) was a German fencer who competed for Saar at the 1952 Summer Olympics. He fenced in the individual and team foil and sabre events.

See also
 Saar at the 1952 Summer Olympics

References

External links
 

1920 births
1993 deaths
German male fencers
Olympic fencers of Saar
Fencers at the 1952 Summer Olympics